

T

Ta

Te

Ti

To

Tu

U

V

Va

Ve

Vi

W

Wa

We

Wo

X

Y

Z

References

External links
Schlumberger Oilfield Glossary

Underwater diving terminology
Underwater diving
Wikipedia glossaries using description lists